Tellur Mutallimov (born on 8 April 1995) is an Azerbaijani football midfielder who plays for Sumgayit in the Azerbaijan Premier League.

Club career

Gabala
Mutallimov made his European debut in 2016 against Georgian FC Samtredia in the first qualification round of the 2016-17 UEFA Europa League which ended 5-1 for Gabala.

Zira
On 30 December 2017, Mutallimov signed a two-year contract with Zira FK.
On 10 June 2019, Mutallimov signed a one-year extension to his Zira contract.

Sumgayit
On 17 July 2020, he signed one-year contract with Sumgayit FK.

International career
Mutallimov made his Azerbaijan debut in 2017 against Qatar in friendly match.

Career statistics

Club

International

Statistics accurate as of match played 9 March 2017

Honours

International
Azerbaijan U23
 Islamic Solidarity Games: (1) 2017

References

External links
 
 Mutallimov profile on official club website
 

1995 births
Living people
People from Khachmaz
Association football midfielders
Azerbaijani footballers
Azerbaijan international footballers
Azerbaijan youth international footballers
Azerbaijan under-21 international footballers
Gabala FC players
Zira FK players
Sumgayit FK players
Azerbaijan Premier League players